Zwickern or Zwicker, is a German fishing card game for two to eight players played in Schleswig-Holstein in North Germany. It is an old game whose rules first appeared in 1930. It has been described as "a simpler and jollier version of Cassino", which is "exciting and entertaining" and easy to learn. German author, Hans Fallada, who learned it in while in gaol at Neumünster, called it "a rather cunning farmer's game from Holstein." The feature that makes it unique among fishing games is its use of up to 6 Jokers.

Names 
Zwickern is the primary or only name given in most book sources and rule sets by playing card manufacturers, with only Mensing calling it Zwickeln and Grupp calling it Zwicker, while acknowledging Zwickern and Zwickeln as alternatives. Meanwhile, according to pagat.com, most players on the ground call the game Zwicker and the card packs produced for the game were also labelled Zwicker (see illustration). Another name is Zwick, named after the eponymous feat of sweeping the table, while Zwickel is also known. The names ending in "-n" are verbal nouns i.e. zwickern simply means "playing [the game of] Zwicker" and zwickeln means "playing [the game of] Zwickel." It should not be confused with the Austro-German gambling game of Zwicken.

History 
Zwicker's origins lie in the old English game of Cassino which is first recorded in a 1792 treatise, but spread rapidly to Germany and America. Cassino faded into obscurity in Europe in the late 19th century, but experienced a brief renaissance in America as new variants appeared. Zwicker probably emerged around the turn of the century, but is first recorded in 1928 as "a rather cunning farmer's game from Holstein played with 52 cards and a Joker". The earliest set of rules appeared in 1930 in Robert Hülsemann's Das Buch der Spiele where the game is much as described below in the variant without Jokers and looks very much like an elaboration of Royal Cassino. Originally, it was played with just a standard 52-card pack but now it is commonly played with 3, 4 or even 6 jokers. Bespoke 58-card packs have been in production since at least the 1950s, but they now appear to be discontinued, the last manufacturer, NSV, no longer offering them in its range. 

In 1935, the 52-card game (presumably without Jokers) was described as popular in Schleswig-Holstein, especially in the Holsteinish regions of Krempermarsch, Wilstermarsch and Dithmarschen as well as the Schleswigian regions of North Frisia and the Eiderstedt peninsula. It was almost never played for money, but usually for a glass of beer or a Grog. Dithmarschen may be where the game originated, but it must have spread and become widely popular in the region in order for special packs to be made for it.

In recent times, it has been played in North Frisia – for example, in Neukirchen, Leck and on the island of Sylt – as well as further east in the county of Schleswig-Flensburg at Sieverstedt  Sillerup,  Großenwiehe and Schafflund. It is still recorded in Holstein at Tappendorf and Windbergen, near its place of origin in Dithmarschen.

Jokers 
Jokers were not originally used in this game, but it is now one of few games that is played with up to six in a single pack. From the 1950s, special Zwicker packs were manufactured for this purpose, initially by ASS Altenburger and, later, also by NSV. The latter firm made them until around 2020. Today they are no longer available and two packs of standard cards each of 3 Jokers with the same back designs are needed to play the versions with 4 to 6 Jokers. Where Jokers used, they play a major role in the game and are usually the most valuable counting cards. Much of the literature follows Hülsemann in allowing no Jokers; in Grupp and Parlett they are optional; but in practice, all accounts by real players include the use of Jokers, albeit their values vary.

According to Grupp (1975), the normal rule is that, whether on the table or played from the hand, they are wild and represent any card chosen by the player. Optional rules to limit these powers include: if a Joker is the only card on the table, it may only be taken by another Joker; if a Joker is used in sweeping all cards from the table, it does not count as a zwick; or even that Jokers may never be picked up from the table, which effectively prevents any more zwicks being made. Parlett follows Grupp, but McLeod points out that no players in Schleswig-Holstein treat the Jokers as wild and believes that Grupp invented the wild Joker rule to explain the Jokers in the pack.

In practice, players use at least 1 and up to 6 Jokers with various matching and scoring values – see below.

Classic Zwicker 
Zwicker was originally played without Jokers and this classic version is still widely published albeit rarely played. The following rules are based on the game as originally described by Hülsemann (1930), but it has changed little since. Variations introduced by later authors are also indicated.

Card values
The matching values of the cards during play are as follows: King – 14, Queen – 13, Jack – 12, Ace – 11 and pip cards – face value.

Aim 

The aim is to capture Aces and Honours (Honneurs i.e. 7, 7, 10) and to make 'sweeps' usually known as zwicks but occasionally as zwickers. The 10 is sometimes called the 'cardinal' (Cardinale or Kardinalblatt).

Playing 
There may be from two to twelve players, each playing alone. If more than four play, two packs are used. Players cut the pack and the player with the lowest card deals first. Deal and play are clockwise. The dealer shuffles and deals four cards to each player, one by one and beginning with forehand to the left and then four face up to the layout or tableau (Bild) on the table. The rest form the stock which is placed face down on the table to one side.

In turn each player plays a hand card and may use it to capture cards from the table. A player may capture table cards either by 'matching', where the value of a hand card is equal to one or more on the table, or by 'summing' if the value of a hand card equals that of two or more cards on the table. For example, a King (card value 14) may capture a 9 and a 5 (together worth 14). A played card may make as many captures as possible. So a Queen can be used to take two Queens from the table and, if the two remaining cards together add up to 13 (the value of a Queen), they may also be collected. If a player clears all the cards on the table, as in the last example, it is a Zwick which scores bonus points when it comes to scoring. The captured trick always includes the hand card played and is placed in a face down trick pile in front of the player. For each Zwick, one card of that trick is turned face up as a record. When all the players have used up their hand cards, the dealer deals four new cards to each player. A player who cannot capture a card or cards from the table, must 'trail', by adding a hand card to the table, or 'build', by placing it partly over an existing table card to increase its value. For example, a 4 may be built on a 7 to increase its value to 11 i.e. the build pile effectively becomes an Ace. Builds may be further added to, but the value of the pile must not exceed 14. Cards placed one on top of the other can only be taken using their combined value.

Scoring 
Once all the cards have been used up, the round ends. If there are any cards left over on the table, they are taken by the player who took the last trick, but this does not count as a Zwick. The winner is the player who has the most points. Points are awarded for taking the most cards, for the capture of certain cards and for taking Zwicks. Scoring is as follows:

Excluding Zwicks there are thus 21 points in single pack or 41 in a double pack.

Variations 
The rules for classic Zwicker have remained remarkably stable with only minor variations. The most detailed later rules are by Grupp. He states that Zwicker was originally played without Jokers but now (1976/86) was mostly played with six. His variations include: players draw cards for first dealer and the highest card wins. A Zwick may be marked either by turning one card over or by placing it at right angles to the rest. Players may set a target score and whoever reaches it first wins; or when they take a break, the player with the lowest score buys a round of beer.

Dietze (1990) introduces two problematic rules. First, builds are not fixed at their new value, but the cards making up the build may be captured individually. However, this negates the point of the build, since it is effectively no different from trailing a card to the table. Second, the tableau must be maintained at a minimum of 4 cards. For example, after a Zwick the next player must lay all 4 hand cards down as the new tableau; if that player has fewer than 4, the following player(s) must lay cards down to bring the tableau back up to 4 or, failing that, cards are taken from stock. However, this appears to be contradicted by the rule that a Zwick is achieved when a player sweeps the entire tableau "whether it consists of one or more cards".

Other deviations from the normal rule that, after a Zwick the next player trails a card, include: the Zwick player trails a card or that all players lay a card each to start a new tableau.

Zwicker with Jokers 
Accounts of people actually playing Zwicker, as opposed to rule books, invariably involve Jokers. This feature is recorded as early as 1928 and distinguishes Zwicker from all other games of the fishing family. Zwicker with Jokers is more complex and challenging than its classic predecessor. The following two versions are recorded by John McLeod and are known to have been actually played. In both cases cards may be built up or down e.g. a player may play a 3 onto a 7 and say "4" or "10". Otherwise the 2 variants have the following differences in matching values and scoring:

Dithmarschen Zwicker 
In this variant for four players in 2 teams of two, 6 Jokers are used with three different matching and scoring levels. Which pattern of Joker represents which level (large, medium or small) must be pre-agreed. The value of the 10 is scaled down. Aces and court cards may have either of two matching values chosen by the player when a card is used in a build or capture.

 Matching values
 King – 4 or 14, Queen – 3 or 13, Jack – 2 or 12, Ace – 1 or 11, pip cards – face value.
 Jokers: small Jokers – 15, middle Jokers – 20, large Jokers – 25.

 Deal and play

The game is played clockwise. The first dealer, after being selected at random, shuffles and offers to the right for cutting, before dealing four cards each and three to the table, face up. Forehand (left of dealer) opens by playing a card to the table, using it to build, capture or trail. Once all hand cards are exhausted the dealer deals four more cards each and the round continues in this way except that the last deal comprises five cards each.

As in classic Zwicker, players may build, capture or trail. Multiple captures may be made, but there is no obligation to capture anything nor to make all possible captures. By agreement partners may point out possible captures. In capturing multiple cards, values may only be added. So a 9 and 3 may be captured by a Jack (9 + 3), but not a 6 (9 – 3). Clearing the table of cards is a zwick; the cards captured are placed face up as a single trick to record it. If there are cards left on the table after the last card is played, they are taken by the team that made the last capture. This does not count as a zwick unless the last play validly captures all the table cards.

Players may build up or down on existing table cards, announcing the total e.g. a 3 may be played on a 9 and the player may announce "6" or "12" as desired. However, the player must hold a card of that value or, the partner must already have declared a build at that value. A single card build may be announced e.g. a Queen may be played and announced as "3" if the player has a Queen or 3 in hand. Builds need not be captured straight away and may be further built on as long as a card is held matching the new total. Separate table cards or piles may not be combined to make a build. A card of the same value as the table card or pile may be built on it without changing its value e.g. a 10 may be built on a 6+4 and announced as "10". Builds may be captured as if they were a single card.

 Scoring

At the end of play, each team scores points as follows:

Teams may agree a target score or decide the winner based on the higher number of points scored over a number of hands. There is a total of 30 points per game excluding Zwicks.

Grossenwiehe Zwicker 
In this variant, which is known in Sillerup and Großenwiehe, the dealer gives 2 cards to each player, then 5 face up to the table; then 2 more to each player and finally 5 more to the table, so that the game starts with ten cards on the table. All 6 Jokers are used, each with a different matching and scoring value. Again, the value of the 10 is reduced.

 Matching values
 King – 4 or 14, Queen – 3 or 13, Jack – 2 or 12, Ace – 1 or 11.
 Six Jokers with individual values: 30, 25, 22, 20, 17, 15.

 Scoring

The player with the most points over several deals wins. There is a total of 83 points per deal, excluding Zwicks. In the event of a tie for most cards, the card points are not awarded and the total is 80 points.

Footnotes

References

Literature 

 Grupp, Claus D. (1976/86). Schafkopf Doppelkopf (in German) Niedernhausern/Ts: Falken. 

 McLeod, John (1999). "Playing the Game: Zwickern" in The Playing Card, Vol. 27, No. 4, ed. Michael Cooper, Jan–Feb 1999. pp. 128-131.

External links 
 Zwickern. Rules in English at pagat.com.
 Zwicker. Rules in German by the Nuremberg Playing Card Company (NSV).
 Zwickern. Rules in German at allekartenspiele.de.

20th-century card games
Card games of Schleswig-Holstein
Fishing card games
French deck card games
German card games
Multi-player card games